"Burn It Down" is a song by American heavy metal band Avenged Sevenfold. It was released as the lead single from their third album, City of Evil, on June 5, 2005.

Background
"Burn It Down" was the first track written for "City of Evil". The song was released as the lead single from the album, but was received poorly by fans.

Live
"Burn It Down" has been played 182 times live. The song made its live debut on May 4th, 2005. A live performance of the song was used for a music video. The video was directed by Nick Wickham.

Track listing

Charts

Personnel
Personnel listing as adapted from album liner notes.

Avenged Sevenfold
 M. Shadows – lead vocals, backing vocals
 Zacky Vengeance – rhythm guitar, co-lead guitar, backing vocals
 The Rev – drums, backing vocals
 Synyster Gates – lead guitar
 Johnny Christ – bass, backing vocals

Production
Produced by Mudrock and Avenged Sevenfold, with additional production by Fred Archambault and Scott Gilman
Mixed by Andy Wallace
Pro Tools by John O'Mahony, assisted by Steve Sisco
Mastered by Eddie Schreyer
Additional vocal production by The Rev, Synyster Gates and M. Shadows
Orchestration by Scott Gilman, The Rev, Synyster Gates and M. Shadows
Drum tech – Mike Fasano
Guitar tech – Stephen Ferrara-Grand

Session musicians
Violinists – Samuel Fischer (soloist), Mark Robertson, Songa Lee-Kitto, Sam Formicola, Bruce Dukov, Alan Grunfeld, Larry Greenfield, Liane Mautner
Violists – David Walther, Matthew Funes, Alma Fernandez
Cellists – Victor Lawrence (soloist), David Low, David Mergen

Choir
Choir leader – Jeannine Wagner
Choir performers – Zachary Biggs, Colton Beyer-Johnson, Josiah Yiu, Nathan Cruz, Stephen Cruz, C.J. Cruz, Sean Sullivan, Alan Hong, Nico Walsh, Sally Stevens

References

2005 songs
2005 singles
Avenged Sevenfold songs
Warner Records singles
Speed metal songs
Power metal songs